Günter Fruhtrunk (1 May 1923 – 12 December 1982) was a German geometric abstract painter and printmaker whose work relates to op art.

Born in Munich, Fruhtrunk studied architecture at the Technische Hochschule in Munich, which he gave up after two semesters to join the army as a volunteer in the fall of 1941. In 1945, Fruhtrunk began to study privately under the painter and printmaker  in Neufrach, who was a student of Adolf Hölzel and Henri Matisse. In 1954 he received a scholarship from the state Baden-Württemberg and the French government and moved to Paris to work in the studios of Fernand Léger and Jean Arp. During the 1960s the painter mainly lived and worked in France. In 1961 he received the Prix Jean Arp in Cologne and in 1966 he was awarded the silver medal of the Prix d'Europe for Painting in Ostende. In 1963 he appeared in the film documentary School of Paris: (5 Artists at Work) by American filmmaker Warren Forma. In 1967, Fruhtrunk began teaching at the Academy of Fine Arts, Munich. It was Fruhtrunk who transformed the ideas of Constructivism to a colorful rhythmical pictorial world, by creating a dynamic language of form with vector-like diagonal lines arranged strictly rhythmically according to their alternating colors. His most conspicuous work was the plastic shopping bag he designed in the early 1970s for Aldi Nord; its use was discontinued in late 2018.

Fruhtrunk committed suicide at the age of 59 in his studio on 12 December 1982.

Notable exhibitions
 1960 – Galerie Denise René, Paris, France (solo)
 1963 – Museum am Ostwall, Dortmund, Germany (solo)
 1968 – 34th Venice Biennale, Venice, Italy
 1968 – 4. documenta, Kassel, Germany
 1970 – Museum Ludwig, Köln, Germany
 1970 – Musée d'Art Moderne de la Ville de Paris, France (solo)
 1973 – , Germany (solo)
 2002 – Günter Fruhtrunk – Rhythme dynamic Stripes, Arithmeum, Bonn, Germany
 2005 – , Haus Konstruktiv, Zurich, Switzerland
 2006 – Conversation with Art, on Art, Bauhaus to Contemporary Art, Tokyo Opera City Art Gallery, Tokyo, Japan
 2007 – Da Bauhaus (Agora!), Museu de Arte de São Paulo, Brazil
 2009 – Alles – , Ludwigshafen, Germany
 2011 – The Erling Neby Collection. Henie Onstad Kunstsenter, Høvikodden, Norway

References

External links
Günter Fruhtrunk Society (in German)
Extensive profile, images, Karl Kreuzer (in German)

1923 births
1982 deaths
Artists who committed suicide
20th-century German painters
20th-century German male artists
German male painters
German abstract artists
Suicides in Germany
Technical University of Munich alumni
Academic staff of the Academy of Fine Arts, Munich
German contemporary artists
20th-century German printmakers
1982 suicides
German Army personnel of World War II